Timothy Malcolm Healy (born 29 January 1952) is a British actor from Newcastle upon Tyne, best known for playing Dennis Patterson in the comedy-drama series Auf Wiedersehen, Pet, Les/Lesley Conroy in the comedy series Benidorm, and Gastric in the comedy series Still Open All Hours.

Early life
Timothy Malcolm Healy was born in the Benwell area of Newcastle upon Tyne on 29 January 1952, the son of Sadie (née Wilson) and Timothy Malcolm Healy Sr. He worked as a welder in a factory and joined the British Army, serving part-time in the 4th Battalion, Parachute Regiment. In 1973, he successfully responded to an advert for the Northern Arts School, obtaining a student grant and moving into acting. He was an early member of the Live Theatre Company, a touring company which put on drama productions in community halls and working men's clubs.

Career

In 1982, Healy appeared in A Captain's Tale, depicting the triumph of West Auckland F.C. in the Sir Thomas Lipton Cup. In 1983, Healy was brought to public attention for his role in Auf Wiedersehen, Pet a TV comedy drama series about British builders working in Germany. 

In 1984 Healy appeared in the  Minder episode  A Star is Gorn, in which he played George, an enforcer for Cyril Ash, a crooked music agent.

During the mid-80s, Healy also played Barney Bodger, the blundering handyman in the Children's ITV series Tickle on the Tum, becoming a favourite with young viewers.

In the early-1990s, he appeared as a cockney ex-pat in the BBC series Boys From The Bush and played a binman in Common as Muck.  In 1994 he appeared in one episode of the fourth series of Heartbeat , he played Cedric Shanks. In 2001, Healy appeared in the surreal BBC situation comedy Breeze Block, playing the head of a strange family. Healy had high hopes for the series, but was reportedly upset when it was only screened on the digital channel BBC Choice (later relaunched as BBC Three) and never broadcast on BBC One or BBC Two. He starred as a folk musician in the first episode of comedy series, Phoenix Nights. His band, "Half a Shilling", sang a song called "Send the Buggers Back", supposedly about a set of Holy Communion shoes, but clearly intended (to those who are themselves racist) as a racist anthem. He played Jackie Elliot in the West End musical Billy Elliot.

Healy appeared in the film Purely Belter as the abusive father of delinquent teenager Gerry and appeared in Coronation Street as Paul Jones, the father of barman Sean Tully. Healy previously appeared on the show in 1976 as a bingo caller. In 2002 Healy appeared as DS Philip Carter In an episode of Silent Witness. 2003, Healy appeared as Inspector Colin Duggan in an episode of the BBC drama Murder in Mind. In 2009, Healy appeared in the BBC drama Waterloo Road as a Security Guard, Dave Miller, a love interest for Steph Haydock, played by his wife at the time, Denise Welch. In 2013, Healy appeared as Eric in the Sky Living Sitcom The Spa for one series.

When Healy's ex wife, Denise Welch, was a guest on The Paul O'Grady Show, an apparently aged man came on the show to talk about a subject. He sounded unwell while Welch was speaking, and to her and everyone's surprise, he revealed himself to be Healy. Healy starred in the third series of the ITV comedy Benidorm playing a cross dresser called Lesley. He later became a regular in the fourth series in 2011. His character is really called Les and has a son, Liam.

Healy has also had a role in Vic Reeves and Bob Mortimer's show Catterick as a helpful man with a chronically cold wife. In November 2013, he filmed a cameo in the first episode of the second series of the BBC sitcom Hebburn.

In September 2009, Healy became the voice of The Greener Company – a wood-burning stove company based in Lymm, Cheshire. Working in conjunction with The Greener Company and Smooth FM, Healy plays the role of David – The Wood-Burning Stove fitter for The Greener Company. David is a character in a series of radio commercials used to promote the company. 

He plays Gastric in Still Open All Hours (2014–present).

Personal life
Healy married actress Denise Welch in 1988. They had two sons before divorcing in 2012; their oldest son, Matthew, is the lead singer of the band The 1975.

Healy married Joan Anderton in 2015. 

He is an avid supporter of Newcastle United FC.

Philanthropy
Healy often shows support for the children's charity, Children North East, which is based in Newcastle, by making appearances at events and showing support at their community based projects. The charity raise funds for youth projects, such as WEYES project, in the west end area where Healy grew up.

He co-founded the Sammy Johnson Memorial Fund, established to support young talent in North East England. He hosts the biannual Sunday for Sammy concerts in aid of the fund.

References

External links
 
 Voice of Wood Burning Stoves
 www.sitcom.co.uk: Boys from the Bush

1952 births
Living people
Male actors from Newcastle upon Tyne
English male film actors
English male television actors
English male musical theatre actors
English male voice actors